Especialmente Para Usted is the second studio album by Mexican group Los Caminantes, released in 1983.

Track listing

References
Allmusic page

1983 albums
Los Caminantes albums